The rectangular lattice and rhombic lattice (or centered rectangular lattice) constitute two of the five two-dimensional Bravais lattice types. The symmetry categories of these lattices are wallpaper groups pmm and cmm respectively. The conventional translation vectors of the rectangular lattices form an angle of 90° and are of unequal lengths.

Bravais lattices 
There are two rectangular Bravais lattices: primitive rectangular and centered rectangular (also rhombic).

The primitive rectangular lattice can also be described by a centered rhombic unit cell, while the centered rectangular lattice can also be described by a primitive rhombic unit cell. Note that the length  in the lower row is not the same as in the upper row. For the first column above,  of the second row equals  of the first row, and for the second column it equals .

Crystal classes 
The rectangular lattice class names, Schönflies notation, Hermann-Mauguin notation, orbifold notation, Coxeter notation, and wallpaper groups are listed in the table below.

References 

Lattice points
Crystal systems